The 22659 / 60 Kochuveli - Yog Nagari Rishikesh Superfast Express is a Superfast Express train belonging to Indian Railways - Southern Railway zone that runs between Kochuveli and Yog Nagari Rishikesh in India. This train runs via Alappuzha. From April 2021, the service to Dehradun was discontinued permanently and was diverted permanently to Yog Nagari Rishikesh and was renamed as Kochuveli - Yog Nagari Rishikesh Superfast Express. The slip coaches to Haridwar also discontinued and extended to Yog Nagari Rishikesh. Therefore it won't go to Dehradun; instead it was diverted permanently to Yog Nagari Rishikesh.

It operates as train number 22659 from Kochuveli to Yog Nagari Rishikesh and as train number 22660 in the reverse direction serving the nine states of Kerala, Karnataka, Goa, Maharashtra, Gujarat, Rajasthan, Delhi, Uttar Pradesh and Uttarakhand.

Coaches

The 22659 / 60 Kochuveli - Yog Nagari Rishikesh Superfast Express runs with highly refurbished LHB coaches. It has 2 AC Two tier, 6 AC Three tier, 8 Sleeper Class, 3 General Unreserved, 1 Pantry Car and  2 EOG (End On Generator) coaches.

As is customary with most train services in India, Coach Composition may be amended at the discretion of Indian Railways depending on demand.

Timings

The 22659 Kochuveli - Yog Nagari Rishikesh Superfast Express covers the distance of 3459 kilometres in 51 hours 35 mins (60 km/hr) & in 54 hours 15 mins as 22660 Yog Nagari Rishikesh -Kochuveli Superfast Express (60 km/hr).

As the average speed of the train is above , as per Indian Railways rules, its fare includes a superfast surcharge.

Routing

The 22659 / 60 Kochuveli - Dehradun Superfast Express runs through the following stations and states:

KERALA
  (Starts)
 
 
 
 
 
 
 
 

KARNATAKA
 
 

GOA
 

MAHARASHTRA
 
 
 
 

GUJARAT
 
 

RAJASTHAN
 

DELHI
 

UTTAR PRADESH
 
 
 

UTTARAKHAND
 
 
  
  (Ends)

Traction

As large part of Konkan Railway are electrified,the train completes its entire journey on fully electrified track.So it is hauled by WAP 7 from Erode or Royapuram Electric loco shed from Kochuveli to Yog Nagari Rishikesh and vice versa.

History

It was introduced as a superfast express between Kochuveli - Dehradun Superfast Express. As Dehradun Railway doesn't hold 24 coaches in platform some slip coaches will be detached at Haridwar which ran as Haridwar - Kochuveli Slip Superfast Express. Since Yog Nagari Rishikesh Railway Station was developed and reconstructed, the railway authority had decided to withdraw coaches running to Dehradun and slip coaches to Haridwar. Instead they decided to run it as a train without slip coaches. After Yog Nagari Rishikesh was developed it was extended to Rishikesh, instead of Dehradun and slip coaches were made to run as a full coach train to Rishikesh. Therefore it runs as Kochuveli - Yog Nagari Rishikesh Superfast Express.

After April 2021, the service to Dehradun and the slip coaches to Haridwar were permanently discontinued and was extended to Rishikesh instead of Dehradun and it will run as Yog Nagari Rishikesh - Kochuveli Superfast Express.

References

External links
 http://www.thehindu.com/todays-paper/tp-national/tp-kerala/regular-service-of-new-trains-to-begin-later/article360533.ece
 https://www.youtube.com/watch?v=8fGS52OTcrM

Transport in Thiruvananthapuram
Trains from Dehradun
Express trains in India
Rail transport in Kerala
Rail transport in Karnataka
Rail transport in Goa
Rail transport in Maharashtra
Rail transport in Gujarat
Rail transport in Rajasthan
Rail transport in Delhi
Konkan Railway